Pratyahara or the 'gathering towards' is the fifth element among the Eight stages of Patanjali's Ashtanga Yoga, as mentioned in his classical work, Yoga Sutras of Patanjali composed in  the 2nd century BCE. It is also the first stage of the six-branch yoga (ṣaḍaṅgayoga) of the Buddhist Kālacakra tantra, where it refers to the withdrawal of the five senses from external objects to be replaced by the mentally created senses of an enlightened deity. This phase is roughly analogous to the physical isolation (kāyaviveka, Tib. lus bden) phase of Guhyasamāja tantra.

For Patanjali, it is a bridge between the bahiranga (external) aspects of yoga namely, yama, niyama, asana, pranayama, and the antaranga (internal) yoga. Having actualized the pratyahara stage, a practitioner is able to effectively engage into the practice of Samyama. At the stage of pratyahara, the consciousness of the individual is internalized in order that the sensations from the senses of taste, touch, sight, hearing and smell don't reach their respective centers in the brain and takes the practitioner to the next stages of Yoga, namely Dharana (concentration), Dhyana (meditation), and samadhi (unification of mind), leading to the recognition (kaivalyam) of Purusha which is the aim of Patanjali's Yogic practices.

Etymology
Together they mean "checking the outgoing powers of the mind, freeing it from the thraldom of the senses ".

Types of Pratyahara

Withdrawal of senses or Indriya Pratyahara

This involves withdrawal of senses, or sensory inputs into our physical being, coming from our five senses, namely organs creating a sensory overload, and hence hinders collection of the mind, as in Dharana, the next stage of Yoga 

One of the most common practices for withdrawal of the senses is bringing the attention inwards towards the breath, observing it without trying to control it, as connection with the external senses and stimuli are all gradually severed. Another method is to concentrate on the point between the eyebrows, the Ajna chakra or  third eye. Another common technique is to first reduce physical stimuli, then concentrate on one sense, such as hearing. The mind has a natural tendency to roam between the sensory inputs. In this situation, as there are no longer any other significant sensory inputs, when the mind gets tired of hearing, it is forced to turn inward. Pratyahara may make use of a meditation seat, such as Padmasana (lotus position), combined with Pranayama breath-control, Kumbhaka, and progressively more subtle internal objects of focus as the practitioner becomes more advanced. At the start, the objects are "gross", directly available to sense perception, such as the points of focus (drishti) used to accompany yoga asana practice, including the space between the eyebrows, the tip of the nose, or the navel. More subtle objects may then be selected, such as the chakras, together with their attributes including position, colour, and number of petals.

Withdrawal of Prana or Prana Pratyahara
Control of our senses requires mastery over the flow of prana, as that is what drives the senses. To stop the scattering of valuable vital energy of the body or prana, we need to seek control over its flow, and harmonize it. This is done through various practices including bringing the entire focus to a single point in the body.

These two lead to the subsequent two types of pratyahara, the Control of Action or 'Karma pratyahara', which entails not just control of motor organs, but also right action or work, and Karma Yoga, surrender of every action to the divine and performing it as an act of service. This leads to the final form of pratyahara - the Withdrawal of Mind or 'Mano pratyahara', which is practiced by consciously withdrawing attention from anything that is unwholesome, and distracting for the mind such as by withdrawing attention from the senses, and directing it inwards

Further reading
  Ayurveda and the Mind, by David Frawley, Lotus Press, Twin Lakes, Wisconsin .
 The Yoga Sutras of Patanjali, Translated by James Haughton Woods. Courier Dover Publications, 2003. .

 Khedrup Norsang Gyatso. Ornament of Stainless Light. Translated by Gavin Kilty. The Library of Tibetan Classics 14. Boston: Wisdom Publications, 2004. .

See also

Dharana
Dhyana in Hinduism
Samādhi
Samyama

References

External links
 Pratyahara Comments on the Patanjali’s Scheme.
 Pratyahara, by Yogacharya
 Patanjali : les Yoga Sûtras, a Yoga Sûtras of Patanjali translation by Sylviane Legrand
 Pratyahara, fifth limb of Yoga Bahiranga.com

Eight limbs of yoga

it:Pratyahara
pt:Pratyahara